The Tebtunis Papyri Archive of Bancroft Library at the University of California, Berkeley is the largest collection of texts on papyrus in the Americas. The phrase Tebtunis archive (uncapitalized) may also be used for the papyri from family archives found at Tebtunis.

The Tebtunis papyri are written in either Demotic Egyptian or Koine Greek and were found during a single expedition led by Bernard Pyne Grenfell and Arthur S. Hunt, two British papyrologists in the winter of 1899/1900 at the village of ancient Tebtunis (near modern Umm-el-Baragat), Egypt.
The papyri can be divided into three groups based on their provenance: texts from the crocodile mummies, the town and from the temple of Soknebtunis, and the cartonnage of human mummies.

Provenance

Crocodile mummy texts
A large portion of the Tebtunis crocodile mummies come from the archive of the komogrammateus or village scribe, of the nearby village, Kerkeosiris, at the end of the 2nd century BC. The Menches papers make up the biggest part of the Crocodile Papyri. These papers are divided into two groups, administrative documents and correspondence. The administrative documents are long reports that detail the state of affairs of every square meter of the area surrounding Kerkeosiris. The correspondence section essentially includes official letters that were addressed to Menches by his superiors and peers in the Ptolemaic bureaucracy.

There also exists a separate group of texts made up of forty-five private documents from the first half of the 1st century BC. These texts were found in five crocodile mummies that had been buried next to each other.

Soknebtunis texts
Grenfell and Hunt's first excavation in 1899 at the Temple of Tebtunis found 200 papyri. The papyri from the town are the most diverse, and they have provided us with literary fragments, including contracts, petitions, declarations, and tax receipts. Most of these papyri concern the priests of the crocodile god, Soknebtunis (Sobek of Tebtunis ), the central deity worshiped in the temples. These documents reveal what life was like for Tebtunis priests when Egypt was under Roman rule.

Cartonnage of human mummy texts
Grenfell and Hunt's second excavation, at the southwest necropolis, unearthed fifty mummy coffins where used papyri had been recycled in the manufacture. The papyri from the cartonnage covering human mummies date from the 3rd and 2nd centuries BC. Most of these documents can be traced back to Oxyrhynchus (modern-day El-Bahnasa), a small village to the north of Tebtunis. These texts are from village officials, the village scribe, and the guards.

Two new documents from the Tebtunis archive
Two papyri have been found that provide evidence regarding two officials, Apion and Kronion, who were in charge of the village record office in Tebtunis during the first half of the 1st century AD. This provides us with more information about certain events in the village of Tebtunis. These documents have been published in two volumes of Papyri from Tebtunis. The village record was directed by Apion from 7 AD to at least 25 AD and by 43 AD it was under the direction of Kronion, son of Apion, until 52 AD.

Lexicological significance
The Tebtunis papyri frequently provide useful light on the usage of Koine Greek in the New Testament period. For example the verb authentein, "to have authority", a hapax legomenon in the New Testament, is documented three times in relation to "bookkeepers having authority" in P.Fam.Tebt.15 (up to 114-15 AD). Texts from the Tebtunis papyri are referenced in both LSJ and BDAG lexicons.

Tebtunis Papyri Volumes
The Tebtunis papyri vol. I, edited with translations and notes by Bernard P. Grenfell, Arthur S. Hunt and J. Gilbart Smyly, 1902, at the Internet Archive
The Tebtunis papyri vol. II, edited with translations and notes by Bernard P. Grenfell, Arthur S. Hunt and J. Edgard Goodspeed, 1907, at the Internet Archive
The Tebtunis papyri vol. III part 1, edited with translations and notes by  Arthur S. Hunt and J. Gilbart Smyly, 1933, at the Internet Archive

References

Further reading
A. M. F. W. Verhoogt, Menches, Komogrammateus of Kerkeosiris,  Brill Archive 1998,

External links
Center for the Tebtunis Papyri
Umm-el-Baragat (Tebtunis)

Ancient Egyptian literature
Egyptian papyri
Greek-language papyri
Hellenistic Egypt
Ptolemaic Kingdom
Roman Egypt